Christian Matthew (born October 26, 1996) is an American football cornerback for the Arizona Cardinals of the National Football League (NFL). He played college football at Georgia Southern before transferring to Samford, and then to Valdosta State, where he was tied for fifth in the nation in pass break ups and was named first-team All-Gulf South Conference. Matthew was invited to and participated in the 2022 College Gridirion Showcase post-season all-star event.

As a senior at Chattahoochee High School, Matthew had 29 catches for 629 yards at wide receiver and 64 tackles and four interceptions on defense on his way to being named second-team all-state and First-team All-Bi-City. He enrolled at Georgia Southern after his senior year before transferring to Samford, citing the lack of a transfer portal influencing his decision to go to an FCS school rather than sit out a year.

Professional career
Matthew was drafted by the Arizona Cardinals in the seventh round (244th overall) of the 2022 NFL Draft.

References

External links
 Arizona Cardinals bio
 Georgia Southern Eagles bio
 Samford Bulldogs bio
 Valdosta State Blazers bio

1996 births
Living people
Players of American football from Columbus, Georgia
American football cornerbacks
Georgia Southern Eagles football players
Samford Bulldogs football players
Valdosta State Blazers football players
Arizona Cardinals players